Dr. Rajesh Sonkar (born 9 December 1968) is an Indian politician currently serving as President of Bharatiya Janta Party (BJP) Indore. He served as National Coordinator (Panchteerth) Bhartiya Janta Party (BJP). He was elected to the Legislative Assembly of Madhya Pradesh in the 2013 elections from Sanwer, Indore. Earlier, he served as a State Vice-president of Bhartiya Janta Yuva Morcha(BJYM) youth wing of BJP and State Vice-president for Schedule Caste Morcha of BJP. He is a prominent Dalit leader of BJP and is close to Rastriya Swamnsevak Sangh(RSS).

References 

People from Indore district
Bharatiya Janata Party politicians from Madhya Pradesh
Living people
21st-century Indian politicians
Politicians from Indore
1968 births